Lojas Renner (Portuguese for Renner Stores) is the largest Brazilian department stores clothing company, headquartered in Porto Alegre - Rio Grande do Sul, Brazil. It was the first Brazilian corporation with 100% of shares traded on Stock Exchange and listed on the Novo Mercado, highest among the different levels of corporate governance in São Paulo Stock Exchange (B3). Its main competitors are Lojas Riachuelo, C&A and Hering.

History

As part of the A.J. Renner group, a manufacturing industry installed in the Navegantes neighborhood, in Porto Alegre (RS - Brazil), Renner inaugurated, in 1922, its first point of sale for selling textile goods. In 1940, still part of the group, the mix of products was expanded and the company started to operate as a department store. In 1965, due to its growth and evolution, the A.J. Renner group decided to make the different companies that formed it independent. At that time, Lojas Renner S.A. was formed, which marks the beginning of the store chain as it is currently known. That same year, the company
became a publicly traded company.

Start of expansion
After decades of good performance, the company underwent a major restructuring in the early 1990s and began to operate in the department store format, specializing in fashion. It totalized eight operations. At a time driven by the successful restructuring and the
implementation of the Philosophy of Enchantment - which highlights that it is not enough to satisfy, it is necessary to exceed customer expectations - Renner expanded beyond Rio Grande do Sul. It reached the states of Santa Catarina, Paraná, São Paulo, Rio de Janeiro, Minas Gerais, and the Federal District, consolidating its position in these markets as a department store specialized in fashion with goods of quality at
competitive pricing.

J.C. Penney
In December 1998, J.C. Penney Brazil Inc., a subsidiary of one of the larges department store chains in the USA, purchased the shareholding control of the
company. Thereby, it gained access to international suppliers, a consultancy with specialists when choosing places of business, as well as the adoption of internal and differentiated procedures and controls. Thus, Renner intensified its expansion process by opening more than 30 units of the company in the South, Southeast, and Midwest of Brazil.

Ilha Plaza Shopping Racism Case 
On August 6, 2020, young Matheus Fernandes was a victim of racism and violence by armed security guards inside one of Renner's Store, the boy was thrown down the stairs, immobilized and had a gun pointed at his head, the case quickly gained international repercussion  and went viral through social networks that soon gained repercussion in the traditional Brazilian media.

Pioneering
In 2002, another important step was taken towards Renner's evolution. The collections started to be developed inspired by five lifestyles, reflecting a way of being and dressing, based on attitudes, interests, values, personalities, and habits of customers. Thus, there lies the creation of the slogan "You have your style. Renner has them all". The products started to be exhibited in a coordinated way, grouping clothes, shoes, and accessories in six own brands that reflect the lifestyles, facilitating the customer's choice and optimizing their shopping time.

First Brazilian Corporation
In June 2005, when the company already had 64 points of sale, J.C. Penney and Renner's managers decided to sell the control of the Company through a public offering of shares on the São Paulo Stock Exchange. Renner then joined the New Market of Bovespa as the first Brazilian company to have its capital dispersed and approximately 100% of the outstanding shares. The following year, in 2006, with the successful dispersion of shares on the stock exchange, the expansion plan was intensified and Renner started its operations in Northeast, opening units in the states of Pernambuco, Ceará, and Bahia. In the same year, the Financial Products area was implemented, with the offer of Personal Loans and Quick Withdrawals, later adding Insurance. The year 2007 marked the continuation of the expansion plan and the arrival in the North, by opening a store in the state of Amazonas. In 2010, the Financial Products area was consolidated by launching the co-branded credit card Meu Cartão Renner, using Visa and MasterCard flags. That same year, Renner launched its e-commerce. The first store within the Renner Sustentável project (Sustainable Renner) opened in 2014, at the mall Riomar Shopping Fortaleza. To finish the year with plenty of reasons to celebrate, Lojas Renner S.A. was selected to be part of the BM & FBOVESPA 2015 Corporate Sustainability Index (ISE) portfolio.

New Businesses
In 2011, Lojas Renner S.A. purchased Camicado, a company in the home and decoration segment that is today spread throughout the country with more than 110
stores. In 2013, it launched Youcom, a new business model for young people in a specialized store environment that now has 98 stores in Brazil. In 2016, Renner launched Ashua, a plus size fashion brand that already has 8 stores across the country. In 2017, Realize CFI, a financial institution, was created.

Internationalization
In 2017, Lojas Renner S.A. took another important step by opening its first operation abroad. Today, there are 9 stores in Uruguay and, in 2019, 4 stores were launched in Argentina. Altogether, Lojas Renner S.A. has 600 stores in operation.

Stores

Today, Lojas Renner is the largest Brazilian retail chain of clothing departments and has over 600 stores, being 382 Renner, 113 stores of Camicado, 98 Youcom stores and 8 Ashua stores. Installed in shopping malls and in points in central cities in the South, Southeast, Midwest, North and Northeast of Brazil. The Company also operates in Uruguay and Argentina.

Lojas Renner Institute
Lojas Renner Institute is a Civil Society Organization of Public Interest (Oscip) created in 2008 as an entity that manages the private social investment of Lojas Renner S.A. It has the mission of promoting the insertion of women in the labor market, supporting entrepreneurial social actions developed by civil society organizations that would contribute effectively to the qualification and inclusion of women and the development of the communities where the company operates. When it was about to complete a decade of existence, starting in 2016, the Institute experienced the consolidation of its purpose, by updating the focus of its mission and redirecting the pillars of action. The year 2017 marked the projects’ alignment with the redesigned mission in 2016. The
initiatives aimed at empowering women in the textile chain. Thus, Lojas Renner Institute started to assist women empowerment projects in communities where the Company is inserted or in locations involved in stages of the fashion chain, that is, with raw materials, production, retail, or post-consumption.

References

Companies listed on B3 (stock exchange)
Department stores of Brazil
Companies based in Rio Grande do Sul
Economy of Porto Alegre
Brazilian brands
1912 establishments in Brazil